Sancho Fernández de Ovando was a Spanish nobleman.

Life
Sancho Fernández de Ovando, was a son of Fernán Pérez de Ovando and wife Luisa López de Moscoso. He was Bailiff-Major (Meriño-Mayor) of Castile.He was the father of Fernando Joanes de Ovando, 1st Duke of Limia.

Sources
Cunha, Fernando de Castro Pereira Mouzinho de Albuquerque e (1906-1998), Instrumentário Genealógico - Linhagens Milenárias. MCMXCV, p. 402

Dukes of Spain